John Dugdale may refer to:

 John Dugdale (photographer) (born 1960), American art photographer
 John Dugdale (footballer) (born 1936), Australian rules footballer who played for the North Melbourne Kangaroos
 John Dugdale (Labour politician) (1905–1963), British newspaper journalist and Labour Party politician, MP 1941–1963
 John Marshall Dugdale (1851–1918), rugby union international who represented England
 John Dugdale (Conservative politician) (1835–1920), British Conservative Party politician, Member of Parliament (MP) for Nuneaton 1886–1892
 John Dugdale (herald) (1628–1700), English officer of arms
 John S. Dugdale, an entomologist from New Zealand

See also
 Sir John Dugdale Astley, 1st Baronet, of Everley (1778–1842), MP for Wiltshire 1820–1832, Wiltshire North, 1832–1835
 Sir John Dugdale Astley, 3rd Baronet (1828–1894), of Everley, MP for Lincolnshire North 1874–1880